Aslan Kakhidze (born October 28, 1988) is a Kazakhstani freestyle wrestler. He competed in the men's freestyle 86 kg event at the 2016 Summer Olympics, in which he was eliminated in the round of 32 by Amarhajy Mahamedau.

References

External links 
 

1988 births
Living people
Kazakhstani male sport wrestlers
Olympic wrestlers of Kazakhstan
Wrestlers at the 2016 Summer Olympics
20th-century Kazakhstani people
21st-century Kazakhstani people